Wild Horse Mesa is a 1932 American Pre-Code Western film directed by Henry Hathaway and starring Randolph Scott and Sally Blane. Based on the novel Wild Horse Mesa by Zane Grey, the film is about an Arizona rancher who goes after a gang that is trapping and catching wild horses using barbed-wire enclosures. Wild Horse Mesa is a remake of the 1925 Paramount silent film of the same name.

Cast
 Randolph Scott as Chane Weymer
 Sally Blane as Sandy Melberne
 Fred Kohler as Rand
 Lucille La Verne as Ma Melberne
 Charley Grapewin as Sam Bass
 James Bush as Bent Weymer
 Jim Thorpe as Indian Chief
 George "Gabby" Hayes as Slack
 Buddy Roosevelt as Horn
 E.H. Calvert as Sheriff

References

External links
 
 
 
 

1932 films
1932 Western (genre) films
Films based on works by Zane Grey
American Western (genre) films
Films based on American novels
Films directed by Henry Hathaway
American black-and-white films
Films set in Arizona
1930s English-language films
1930s American films